Eooxylides tharis, the branded imperial, is a butterfly in the family Lycaenidae. It was described by Carl Geyer in 1837. It is found in the Indomalayan realm.

Subspecies
Eooxylides tharis tharis (Sumatra)
Eooxylides tharis distanti Riley, 1942 (Peninsular Malaysia, Singapore, Tioman, Thailand)
Eooxylides tharis latipictus Fruhstorfer, 1904 (Nias)
Eooxylides tharis tharisides Fruhstorfer, 1904 (Borneo)
Eooxylides tharis javanicus Fruhstorfer, 1904 (Java)
Eooxylides tharis enganicus Fruhstorfer, 1904 (Enggano)
Eooxylides tharis watsoni van Eecke, 1914 (Simuelue)
Eooxylides tharis ritsemae van Eecke, 1914 (Belitung)

Gallery

References

External links
Eooxylides at Markku Savela's Lepidoptera and Some Other Life Forms

Eooxylides
Butterflies described in 1837